Forever Blowing Bubbles is a progressive rock album by Clearlight, released in 1975 on Virgin Records in the UK.

Its predecessor Clearlight Symphony having been released earlier in 1975, Cyrille Verdeaux was offered to record a follow-up effort. This time, he decided to work with a full band, using several musicians he had played with on the one-off Delired Cameleon Family project, most notably bassist Joël Dugrenot (formerly of Zao), and during the summer of 1975 studio time was booked at Virgin's Manor studio in England. English musicians sat in alongside their French counterparts, including former King Crimson violinist David Cross and two of Hatfield and the North's occasional backing vocalists The Northettes.

The album covers many contrasting genres including psychedelic, new age, folk, rock and jazz fusion jamming, and the closing track of abstract electronic music experimentation. Only two songs have vocals, and are sung in French.

Following the release of the album, Clearlight embarked on a UK tour supporting Gong, with an altered line-up comprising Verdeaux, Dugrenot, Jeanneau, D'Agostini, and new members Coco Roussel (drums, ex Heldon, and later in Happy The Man), Jorge Pinchevsky (violin, later in Gong) and Francis Mandin (synthesizers).

Cover art
The cover depicts connections with previous albums, which became a trend in Clearlight album covers from this point onward.  On the cover of Clearlight Symphony, cables connect an electrical box to a head, with one cable leading off in the distance, over the horizon.  On the cover of Forever Blowing Bubbles, the same cable comes over the horizon, and ends in a disconnected DIN plug lying in the grass, blowing bubbles.  The grass appears to be a redrawing of the marijuana leaves from the back cover of Delired Cameleon Family, but are now just ordinary lawn grass.

Track listing

Side one
"Chanson" (Joël Dugrenot) – 4:50
"Without Words" (Cyrille Verdeaux) – 7:30
"Way" (Dugrenot) – 8:00

Side two
"Ergotrip" (Verdeaux) – 6:35
"Et Pendant ce Temps La" (Verdeaux) – 4:10
"Narcisse et Goldmund" (Verdeaux / Beatrice d'Eaubonne) – 2:30
"Jungle Bubbles" (Verdeaux) – 2:40

Personnel
Cyrille Verdeaux – grand piano, harpsichord, synthesizer, organ, glockenspiel, Mellotron, gongs, congas
Joël Dugrenot – bass, lead vocals
Jean-Claude d'Agostini – electric guitar, 12-string guitar, flute in C
François Jeanneau – saxophones, flutes
Bob Boisadan – electric piano, organ, synthesizer
Chris Stassinopoulos – drums, congas
David Cross – violin, electric violin
Christian Boulé – cosmic guitar
Gilbert Artman – percussion, drums, maracas, vibraphone
Amanda (Parsons) and Ann (Rosenthal, of the Northettes who are mentioned in the thank-yous; see Hatfield and the North) – celestial choir
Bruno Verdeaux – synthesizer, aquatic congas
Brigitte Roy – vocals (on "Narcisse et Goldmund")

produced by Cyrille Verdeaux and Mick Glossop

Clearlight (French band) albums
1975 albums
Virgin Records albums
Jam band albums